Amingaon  is a locality in North Guwahati. Amingaon is the district headquarter of Kamrup (Rural) district of Assam. It is also future hub of Assam with many mega projects due to massive expansion of Guwahati metropolitan city.

Geography

Location
National Highway 31 passes through Amingaon. The nearest airport is Guwahati Airport.

References

External links
 About Amingaon
 Satellite map of Amingaon

Cities and towns in Kamrup district
Neighbourhoods in Guwahati